Hovell is a surname. Notable people by that name include:

 William Hovell (1786–1875), English explorer of Australia. 
 Mark Hovell (1888–1916), English historian.

Hovell-Thurlows
 Francis Hovell-Thurlow-Cumming-Bruce, 8th Baron Thurlow
 Thomas Hovell-Thurlow-Cumming-Bruce, 5th Baron Thurlow
 Roualeyn Hovell-Thurlow-Cumming-Bruce, 9th Baron Thurlow
 Edward Hovell-Thurlow, 2nd Baron Thurlow
 Henry Hovell-Thurlow-Cumming-Bruce, 7th Baron Thurlow
 Charles Hovell-Thurlow-Cumming-Bruce, 6th Baron Thurlow